TV Hüttenberg is a German handball club from Hüttenberg, Germany, that plays in the 2. Handball-Bundesliga.

Crest, colours, supporters

Kits

External links
Official website

German handball clubs
Sport in Hesse